The British Council of the Gaelic Athletic Association or Britain GAA is the only provincial council of the Gaelic Athletic Association outside the island of Ireland (however, the Headquarters of Ulster GAA is also in the UK), and is responsible for Gaelic games in Great Britain. The board is also responsible for the British Gaelic football, hurling, camogie and ladies' Gaelic football inter-county teams.

London compete in the National Hurling League in hurling, and in the All-Ireland Senior Football Championship (as part of Connacht) and National Football League in Gaelic football. Since the reorganisation of the hurling championships into 3 tiers, London now play in the tier 2 Christy Ring Cup while Warwickshire and Lancashire play in the tier 4 Lory Meagher Cup.

The British Council is responsible for the seven GAA counties of Britain: Gloucestershire, Hertfordshire, Lancashire, London, Scotland, Warwickshire and Yorkshire. The GAA counties cover wider areas than their names suggest; the Hertfordshire County Board, for example, oversees clubs in Hertfordshire, Bedfordshire, Cambridgeshire and Oxfordshire; Gloucestershire GAA reaches into South Wales, Warwickshire GAA includes Staffordshire and Birmingham, and so on. The most popular sport is Gaelic football and some clubs are dedicated only to that sport.

County boards 

Gloucestershire
Hertfordshire
Lancashire
London
Scotland
Warwickshire
Yorkshire

History
The history of the London branch of the  Gaelic Athletic Association (GAA) dates back to the 19th century. Sam Maguire started his career here.

The old Wembley Stadium has played host to a number of Gaelic football and hurling games, the first taking place in 1958.

Facilities
Many British GAA games are played on council fields, there are some dedicated GAA grounds in Britain. The two main grounds are the Emerald GAA Grounds, in Ruislip, London, and Páirc na hÉireann, in Solihull, near Birmingham.

Hurling

Current Hurling County Teams

Football

Competitions

Inter-county 

 All-Britain Junior Football Championship

London compete in the Connacht championship and their 2nd team competes in the Britain championship.

Club 

 All-Britain Junior Club Football Championship
The winners qualify for the All-Ireland Junior Club Football Championship.

Current Football County Teams

All-Britain Junior Club Football Championship

Note: this championship does not include London's senior champions since 2002

All-Britain Junior Football Championship

 Warwickshire: 1968, 1969, 1973

References

External links
Britain.gaa.ie
British GAA on Hoganstand.com
London GAA site
English clubs (archived 2015)
Welsh clubs (archived 2006)
Scottish clubs (archived 2016)

 
1898 establishments in England
 
Provincial councils of the Gaelic Athletic Association
Sports organizations established in 1898